Conchita Martínez was the three-time defending champion and successfully defended her title, defeating Martina Hingis in the final, 6–2, 6–3.

Seeds
A champion seed is indicated in bold text while text in italics indicates the round in which that seed was eliminated. The top eight seeds received a bye to the second round.

  Steffi Graf (quarterfinals)
  Conchita Martínez (champion)
  Arantxa Sánchez Vicario (quarterfinals)
  Iva Majoli (semifinals)
  Magdalena Maleeva (quarterfinals)
  Martina Hingis (final)
  Irina Spîrlea (semifinals)
  Nathalie Tauziat (quarterfinals)
  Judith Wiesner (third round)
  Petra Begerow (first round)
  Yayuk Basuki (second round)
  Sandrine Testud (third round)
  Lindsay Lee (second round)
  Joannette Kruger (second round)
  Florencia Labat (first round)
  Barbara Schett (third round)

Draw

Finals

Top half

Section 1

Section 2

Bottom half

Section 3

Section 4

References
 1996 Italian Open Draw

Women's Singles
Singles